The Hopkins Feed and Seed Store is a historic commercial building at 301 East 3rd Street in downtown Texarkana, Arkansas.  It is a single-story brick building roughly rectangular, with a beveled entrance at the corner of 3rd and South Wood Streets.  It was built c. 1922 by Roy Hopkins, who operated a feed store and chicken hatchery on the premises.  The building, still used as a feed store, is the only one of the period to survive on the block.

The building was listed on the National Register of Historic Places in 2008.

See also
National Register of Historic Places listings in Miller County, Arkansas

References

External links

Commercial buildings on the National Register of Historic Places in Arkansas
Buildings designated early commercial in the National Register of Historic Places
Commercial buildings completed in 1922
Buildings and structures in Texarkana, Arkansas
National Register of Historic Places in Miller County, Arkansas
1922 establishments in Arkansas
Feed stores